ZCO could refer to:

 Croxley tube station, London; National Rail station code ZCO
 La Araucanía International Airport near Temuco, Chile; IATA airport code ZCO
 The Zonal Computing Olympiad, one of the component competitions of the Indian Computing Olympiad